Donacaula niloticus is a species of moth in the family Crambidae. It is found in Bulgaria, Romania, Greece, China (Gansu), Turkey, Russia, India and North Africa, including Algeria and Egypt.

The forewings are luteous yellow with black spots and a white spot surrounded with black on the transverse vein. The hindwings are whitish with a transverse row of brownish spots posteriorly.

References

Moths described in 1867
Schoenobiinae
Moths of Africa
Moths of Europe
Moths of Asia